Herea prittwitzi is a moth of the subfamily Arctiinae. It was described by Heinrich Benno Möschler in 1872. It is found in French Guiana and Bolivia.

References

Arctiinae
Moths described in 1872